Flight (also known as Fly High) is a 2009 South Korean film.

Plot
Si-bum dreams of becoming an actor. One day, he meets Su-kyoung and falls in love with her at first sight. With Si-bum around, Su-kyoung seems to get over her depression and her strained relationship with her father, but suddenly Su-kyoung disappears to confront her mother's death. After receiving contact, Si-bum meets up with Su-kyoung at the sea and both escape their realities. Su-kyoung becomes severely injured in an accident, and in desperately struggling to save her, Si-bum steals money to pay her hospital bills. However, he had stolen from a gang who catches and forces him to work as a male escort. Si-bum uses his acting skills to cheer up a recovering Su-kyoung pretending he makes a living from acting. As his popularity rises as an escort, he follows Ho-su, his boss and mentor, to make more money in Seoul. One day he comes across one of his old friends and gets involved in a big fight.

Cast
 Kim Bum as Si-bum
 Kim Byul as Su-kyoung
 Bae Soo-bin as Ho-su
 Lee Chae-young as Su-ah
 Yeon Je-wook as Gu-taek
 Kim Jin-woo as Young-ho
 Ko Yun-ho as Se-joong
 Bang Young as Detective Oh
 Kim Hye-jin sd Seong-ju
 Kim Jung-heon as Amazonness Si-bum host
 Park Min-jung as Woman from affair
 Ban Min-jeong as Hye-jeong
 Won Poong-yeon as Gi-doong
 Lee Chan-ho as Youngest

References

External links
 https://web.archive.org/web/20130512194122/http://www.flyup.kr/
 
 

South Korean romantic drama films
South Korean action drama films
South Korean teen films
2000s teen drama films
2000s Korean-language films
2000s teen romance films
2009 action drama films
2009 films
2000s South Korean films